WLUM-FM (102.1 MHz) is a commercial radio station in Milwaukee, Wisconsin. The station airs an Alternative rock music format branded as "FM 102/1". Its studios are located in Menomonee Falls and the transmitter site is in Milwaukee's North Side at Lincoln Park.

The station is owned by the estate of former Green Bay Packer Willie Davis and his company, All-Pro Broadcasting. All-Pro has owned the station since 1979. WLUM is run as a partnership with co-owned WZTI and Shamrock Broadcasting's WLDB as a group called the Milwaukee Radio Alliance.

History

Showtunes (1960-1964)
WMKE (102.1 FM) launched in September 1960, broadcasting from studios located on North Avenue in Milwaukee with a format consisting primarily of Broadway show tunes. The owners boasted that they were the nation's first "all-tape radio station", meaning that all programming would originate from reel-to-reel tape or other tape formats, rather than phonograph records, as they believed tape delivered higher quality.

Gospel/R&B (1964-1979) 
The station was later sold and became WAWA-FM in 1964. The new format featured black gospel music and also simulcast the rhythm and blues format of the then-sister station WAWA (1590 AM) throughout the 1960s and most of the 1970s.

Disco (1979-1982) 
Former Packer legend Willie Davis purchased and split the programming of the two stations on February 14, 1979, switching WAWA-FM to WLUM (short for We Love YoU Milwaukee!), and giving 102.1 FM its own distinct format focusing on disco music. At the time that WAWA-FM became WLUM, they also became the second station in Milwaukee to adopt the Disco format, as WNUW had already beat them to it in October 1978, even though their success would be short lived by August 1979.

The daytime-only 1590 AM, still WAWA, later picked up the WLUM call letters. The AM station was long hampered by a weak signal, and when All Pro Broadcasting purchased stronger station WMVP (1290 AM), the format and programming moved there. As a result, 1590 AM went dark in 1988, and its broadcast license turned in to the FCC.

Rhythmic (1982-1991)
WLUM has gone through many changes and tweaks over the years since its debut in 1979. In all incarnations since, they have carried the WLUM call sign. In the beginning, WLUM played Disco and Soul hits, though a different format than its AM sister station. In 1982, the station began adding more Urban music, and by the summer of 1983, the station's format morphed into a Rhythmic Contemporary Hits presentation with the brandings "WLUM FM 102", "WLUM 102 Milwaukee's Hot FM", "Club 102 WLUM", "Power 102 WLUM", "WLUM 102 FM", and then following later as "Hot 102 WLUM" as they aired a mix of dance music (including Freestyle, House and Club Imports) and Top 40 hits (including Rock and Modern/Alternative tracks). By 1989, WLUM was featuring shows like "Casey's Top 40" and "American Dance Traxx" as it began to shift further towards a Dance-leaning direction that was loosely patterned after Power 106 in Los Angeles under the guidance of veteran Rhythmic program director and future consultant Rick Thomas before moving on to launch XHITZ/San Diego's Rhythmic format in April 1990. It was also during this period that Bubba the Love Sponge briefly did an airshift at Hot 102.

Top 40 (1991-1994) 
By late 1991, WLUM evolved into a straightforward CHR presentation. More hip-hop was added to the playlist by the following year, to better compete with upstart rival V100.7 for the urban audience. By late 1993, it began shifting back to a Dance-leaning direction, billing themselves as "Hot 102 WLUM, Milwaukee's Party Station". This lasted until the Summer of 1994, when it shifted back to mainstream Top 40.

Alternative (1994-1998)
By 1994, WLUM began tweaking their on-air presentation. Hip-hop was slowly being phased out and more modern rock was added to the playlist, due to Davis' desire to distance his station from the violent image of most rap and hip-hop music, after finding out that the station had begun to carry a nightly hour of uncensored music after the FCC's "safe harbor" regulations were not in effect (a record homicide count in Milwaukee and several area violent crimes also played into the re-shift). This began to occur in earnest on December 1, 1993, when Wauwatosa West High School assistant principal Dale Breitlow was murdered by a former student, and the station immediately pulled Dr. Dre's "Dre Day" and Eazy-E's "Real Compton City G's" in reaction, dropping their usual music and allowing those affected to call-in about how the shooting affected them. The modern rock music was well received by listeners, and in October of that year, the station adopted modern rock full-time, as "New Rock 102ONE".

Adult alternative (1998-1999) 
Over the years, the format underwent much tweaking. After adding more classic rock tracks to the playlist, the station began a brief run with an adult album alternative format on June 23, 1998, at 5:00 PM. After stunting with elevator music, a voice broke said, "Thank you for holding. This concludes our broadcast day." This was followed by Jimi Hendrix's version of The Star-Spangled Banner to launch the new format. Artists played during this era included Rolling Stones, Nirvana, Melissa Etheridge, Led Zeppelin, Dave Matthews Band, and The Doors.

Active rock (1999-2002) 
The move was unsuccessful, so in December, WLUM switched to hard rock with the syndicated Mancow Muller in the morning. They initially avoided much of the then-popular nu metal music that WLZR played, but added a great deal to the playlist by 2001. Nonetheless, they were consistently a distant second to market leader WLZR.

As a straight-ahead rock station, WLUM experienced some of its lowest ratings levels ever, with the bottom coming after the September 11 attacks, which caused many rock stations to shift quickly from hard rock tracks inappropriate for play in the aftermath and change away from aggressive formats.

Alternative (2002-present) 
In March 2002, WLUM began making more changes. Mancow's morning show was dropped, along with most of the hard rock music on the playlist, and modern rock music returned to the playlist. By September, the station was once again a full-time reporter to alternative rock airplay charts for radio industry trade magazines. The station still experienced low ratings, as it worked to shake its male-oriented hard rock image. The station made heavy use of consultants who crafted a rather tight playlist. In March 2003, the Indianapolis-based Bob and Tom was added in the morning drive to compete against Bob & Brian up the dial on WLZR, but its older target audience proved wildly incompatible for the rest of WLUM's younger-skewing broadcast day.

The Bob and Tom agreement ran out in 2005, and a locally oriented morning show, "Kramp and Adler", debuted on St. Patrick's Day. This was a sign of more changes to come. On July 10, 2006, WLUM began stunting as "Quick 102" and started playing five-second song clips back-to-back. At the same time, via on-air promos, they poked fun at themselves and their many failed on-air tweaks and changes over the years. At 5:00 PM the next day, the modern rock format was relaunched with a new programming and on-air staff in place. The station admitted past mistakes, then announced their "independence", stating they were now free from corporate practices and radio consultants and pledged a stronger dedication to their listeners and the local community. As part of the new direction, Program Director Jacent Jackson rolled out a modified alternative rock format with a more diverse playlist, featuring, among other things, more indie rock. The first song after the relaunch was "Guerrilla Radio" by Rage Against the Machine. Jackson also added new DJs to the airstaff such as Michelle Rutkowski from WKQX in Chicago, and changed the name of the station to "FM 102.1" with the slogan, 'Independent. Alternative. Radio.' The station also removed their last remaining syndicated show, Loveline, vowing to be 100% local in their on-air presentation.

Later, the station sponsored a contest to name a new alternative rock festival on the Summerfest grounds that took place in June 2010. It became known as the "Verge Music Festival". During this time, the station also adjusted their positioning statement from 'Independent. Alternative. Radio' to 'Sounds Different.'

In 2014, Program Director Jacent Jackson departed to program KITS in San Francisco and Michelle Rutkowski took over the PD reigns. Current specialty shows consist of "FM 102/1 Retro Brunch" - three hours of Classic Alternative titles Sunday mornings from 7-10 am, "Indie Soundcheck" (Sunday nights 8-11 pm) with Ryan Miller, "Neighborhood Watch" - an hour of local Milwaukee music hosted by Ian McCain Sunday nights at 11 pm. The current full-time line-up includes Adler (6-10 am), Michelle Rutkowski (10 am-2 pm), Ian McCain (2-7 pm), and Schroeder (7 pm-midnight) with the current part-time line-up consisting of Kelly Katona, Ryan Miller, and Schroeder.

Big Snow Shows
As a part of the re-branding in 2006, FM 102/1 has held an annual Big Snow Show — the first including My Chemical Romance, Rise Against and Red Jumpsuit Apparatus at the Riverside Theater (Milwaukee) on Wednesday, December 13, 2006. 2007's BSS was held in the same location on Sunday, December 16 with Coheed and Cambria, Jimmy Eat World, Shiny Toy Guns and The Starting Line. In 2008, Big Snow Show 3 switched venues to its current home at The Rave/Eagles Club with headliners Death Cab For Cutie, Jack's Mannequin and The Ting Tings on Tuesday, December 2.

The following FM 102/1 Big Snow Show Lineups:

Big Snow Show 4 — Thursday, December 17, 2009 — Eagles Ballroom — After Midnight Project, Breaking Benjamin, Sick Puppies, Thirty Seconds to Mars

Big Snow Show 5 — Monday, December 13, 2010 — The Rave — CAKE, Ok Go, Switchfoot / Tuesday, December 14, 2010 — The Rave — Chevelle, Finger Eleven

Big Snow Show 6 — Thursday, December 15, 2011 — The Rave — Cage The Elephant, Sleeper Agent, The Joy Formidable

Big Snow Show 7 — Saturday, December 8, 2012 — The Rave — Silversun Pickups, The Joy Formidable, iamdynamite / (Family of the Year and Churchill performed BSS Cocktail Hour in The Rave basement)

Big Snow Show 8 — Thursday, December 12, 2013 — Eagles Ballroom — Phoenix (band), alt-j, Grouplove, Bastille / Friday, December 13, 2013 — Eagles Ballroom — Arctic Monkeys, Foals, NONONO

Big Snow Show 9 — Tuesday, December 2, 2014 — Eagles Ballroom — Cage The Elephant, Fitz and the Tantrums, Meg Myers, alt-j, Vance Joy / Tuesday, December 16, 2014 — Eagles Ballroom — Fall Out Boy, WALK THE MOON, Vinyl Theatre / The Big Snow Show Hangover show featured banks (singer) and The Living Statues in The Rave on Thursday, December 18, 2014,

Big Snow Show 10 — Thursday, December 10, 2015 — Eagles Ballroom — Weezer, X Amabassadors, Glass Animals, BORNS / Friday, December 11, 2015 — Eagles Ballroom — Of Monsters and Men, Cold War Kids, Meg Myers / Saturday, December 12, 2015 — Eagles Ballroom — Panic at the Disco, Atlas Genius, Frank Turner, JR JR

Big Snow Show 11 — Friday, December 2, 2016 — Eagles Ballroom — The Head and the Heart, Jimmy Eat World, Fitz and the Tantrums, Bishop Briggs / Thursday, December 8, 2016 — Eagles Ballroom — Bastille, Awolnation, Andrew McMahon in the Wilderness, Barns Courtney (Judah and the Lion was featured for the BSS Happy Hour in The Rave Bar)

Big Snow Show 12 — Thursday, November 30, 2017 — Eagles Ballroom — WALK THE MOON, Foster The People, AJR / Friday, December 1, 2017 — Eagles Ballroom — Paramore, Dashboard Confessional, The Wrecks / Saturday, December 2, 2017 — Eagles Ballroom — Phoenix, Lord Huron, Cold War Kids, Welshly Arms

Big Snow Show 13 — Thursday, November 27, 2018 — Eagles Ballroom — Bastille, Young The Giant, Bishop Briggs, grandson / Thursday, November 29, 2018 — The Rave — Elle King, Flora Cash / Saturday, December 1, 2018 — Eagles Ballroom — Death Cab For Cutie, Jungle, Albert Hammond Jr., Barns Courtney

Big Snow Show 14 — Thursday, December 10, 2019 — Eagles Ballroom — Cage The Elephant, Angels and Airwaves, The Federal Empire / Sunday, December 15, 2019 — The Rave — PVRIS, Misterwives, SHAED

Slogans and Timeline
1960-1964: Adult standards, Showtunes (as WMKE)
1964-1979: Rhythm and Blues, Gospel, Jazz (as WAWA-FM)
1979-1982: "WLUM Stereo 102, The Station With A Heart" (Jazz/Disco/Soul)
1982-1983: "LOVE 102 WLUM Stereo" (Urban Contemporary)
1983-1989: "WLUM Power 102 FM, Milwaukee's Hot FM" (CHUrban)
1989-1992: "More Music, Better Variety, WLUM 102 FM" (CHUrban)
1992-1993: "The All New Hot 102 WLUM" (CHR)
1993-1994: "Hot 102 WLUM" (CHUrban)
Mid-1994: "Hot 102 WLUM, Milwaukee's Party Station" (CHR)
September 1994-June 1998: "New Rock 102ONE" (Modern Rock)
June 1998-December 1998: "102ONE WLUM" ("Great Rock, Real Variety") (Adult Album Alternative)
December 1998 - August 2001: "ROCK 102ONE" (Album-oriented rock)
August 2001 - June 2002: "ROCK 102ONE" (Active Rock)
June 2002 to April 2005: "ROCK 102ONE" ("Milwaukee's Rock Alternative") (alternative rock)
April 2005 - July 10, 2006: "102ONE" ("Milwaukee's Alternative Station") (alternative rock)
July 11, 2006 - 2010:  "FM 102.1" ("Independent. Alternative. Radio.") (alternative rock)
2010–present: "FM 102/1 Sounds Different." (alternative rock)

References

External links
Official Website
Hot 102 Online
Former program director Tommy Wilde's website
Former PD Alex Cosper's experience at WLUM

LUM-FM
Modern rock radio stations in the United States
Radio stations established in 1940
1940 establishments in Wisconsin
African-American history of Milwaukee